Jacob Rotius (11 September 1644, Hoorn – 1681, Hoorn), was a Dutch Golden Age painter.

Biography
According to Houbraken he was a pupil of Jan Davidsz de Heem, whose style he successfully copied. He earned a good living as a flower painter, but died relatively young due to his "melancholy attitude".

According to the RKD he was the son of Jan Albertsz Rotius, and specialized in flower and vegetable still life paintings.

References

Jacob Rotius on Artnet

1644 births
1681 deaths
Dutch Golden Age painters
Dutch male painters
People from Hoorn
Dutch still life painters
Flower artists